Don D. Alt (December 15, 1916 – August 18, 1988) was an American politician and businessman.

Born in St. Joseph, Missouri, Alt went to the Des Moines, Iowa public schools and graduated from Roosevelt High School. He served in the United States Army during World War II. Alt went to Drake University and Iowa State University. He worked at the Home Federal Loan and Savings in Des Moines and was a vice-president. Alt served in the Iowa House of Representatives from 1969 to 1973 and was a Republican. In 1985, Alt moved to Las Cruces, New Mexico. He died in Las Cruces, New Mexico.

Notes

1916 births
1988 deaths
Politicians from St. Joseph, Missouri
Politicians from Des Moines, Iowa
Politicians from Las Cruces, New Mexico
Military personnel from Iowa
Military personnel from Missouri
Drake University alumni
Iowa State University alumni
Businesspeople from Iowa
Republican Party members of the Iowa House of Representatives
20th-century American politicians
United States Army personnel of World War II
20th-century American businesspeople